Chrysopolomides nivea is a moth in the genus Chrysopolomides. It’s in the family Chrysopolominae.

Distribution 
Chrysopolomides nivea occurs in Cameroon, Central African Republic and Ghana.

References 

Moths described in 1903
Limacodidae
Chrysopolominae